Mulla-Kamysh (Mulla-Qamış) is a rural locality (a village) in Verkhnebishindinsky Selsoviet, Tuymazinsky District, Bashkortostan, Russia. The population was 40 as of 2010. There is 1 street.

Geography 
Mulla-Kamysh is located 25 km south of Tuymazy (the district's administrative centre) by road. Samsykovo is the nearest rural locality.

References 

Rural localities in Tuymazinsky District